Ajjavara  is a village in the southern Indian state of Karnataka. It is located in the Sullia taluk of Dakshina Kannada district in Karnataka.

Demographics
 Indian census, Ajjavara had a population of 6692 with 3406 males and 3286 females.

Temples 
The Mahishamardhini Temple in Ajjavara attracts devotees from the surrounding villages. There is a Veda Pathashaala near it.

See also
 Dakshina Kannada
 Districts of Karnataka

References

Villages in Dakshina Kannada district